The Hamilton Amateur Athletic Association Grounds (also known as Hamilton AAA Grounds or HAAA) is a park located on the north side of Charlton Avenue West, between Locke Street South and Queen Street South, in Hamilton, Ontario, Canada. The park served as home to the Hamilton Tigers from 1872 to 1949. In 1950, the Tigers amalgamated with the Hamilton Wildcats to create the Hamilton Tiger-Cats. The new team became the permanent tenants of Civic Stadium (later Ivor Wynne Stadium), and played their home games there until 2012. The Tiger-Cats joined the Canadian Football League as an inaugural member in 1958. A plaque outlining much of the grounds' history (including information on the Grey Cup games played there) is located next to the main entrance on Charlton.

Grey Cup at HAAA Grounds

External links
Timeline of Canadian football history

Sports venues in Hamilton, Ontario
Defunct Canadian football venues
Defunct sports venues in Canada